Thomas Alva Bartlett (born August 20, 1930) is an American educator who is most notable for having served as president of  several universities and university systems.

Bartlett was born in Salem, Oregon, and was youngest of three sons of Cleave Bartlett, an auditor-bookkeeper and real estate broker, and the former Alma Hanson, a housewife.  In 1947, he graduated from Salem High School.  He attended Willamette University for two years, where he joined Beta Theta Pi fraternity, before transferring to Stanford University, where he was elected to the Phi Beta Kappa Society.  After graduating in 1951 with a bachelor's degree in political science, he attended Oxford University as a Rhodes Scholar, earning a master's degree. In 1959 he was awarded a Ph.D. degree from Stanford University.  While still in graduate school, he was recruited to join the United States Permanent Mission to the United Nations to work on Arab-Israeli relations.  From, there, he became the president of the American University in Cairo.

From 1969 to 1977, he assumed the presidency of Colgate University as well as the chancellorships of the University of Alabama System and the Oregon State System of Higher Education from the 1970s to the 1980s.  He also served as president of the Association of American Universities.  He was called out of a brief retirement to head the State University of New York System in 1994, but conflicts with George Pataki appointees on the university's board of trustees led to his resignation after just 17 months on the job.

After SUNY, he became chairman of the board of trustees of the United States-Japan Foundation, leaving after seven years to re-assume the Presidency of the American University in Cairo on an interim basis.

The Thomas A. Bartlett Chair of English at Colgate University is named after him.

References

1930 births
American Rhodes Scholars
Presidents of Colgate University
Living people
The American University in Cairo
People from Salem, Oregon
Chancellors of the State University of New York
Stanford University alumni
University of Alabama System
Willamette University alumni
North Salem High School (Salem, Oregon) alumni
Chancellors of the University of Alabama System
American expatriates in Egypt
Presidents of the Association of American Universities